is a Quasi-National Park in Shiga Prefecture and Kyoto Prefecture, Japan. In June 1993 an area of 65,984 ha beside Lake Biwa was designated a Ramsar Site and wetland of international importance.

See also

 List of national parks of Japan
 Ramsar sites in Japan

References

National parks of Japan
Parks and gardens in Shiga Prefecture
Parks and gardens in Kyoto Prefecture
Protected areas established in 1950
1950 establishments in Japan